Macbeth is a 1987 French film of Verdi's opera  Macbeth (libretto by Francesco Maria Piave based on Shakespeare's play) Directed by Claude d'Anna, it was screened out of competition at the 1987 Cannes Film Festival.

Cast
 Leo Nucci as Macbeth
 Shirley Verrett as Lady Macbeth
 Samuel Ramey as Banco (voice)
 Johan Leysen as Banco
 Veriano Luchetti as Macduff (voice)
 Philippe Volter as Macduff
 Antonio Barasonda as Malcolm
 Anna Caterina Antonacci as Dama
 Sergio Fontana as Medico
 Gianfranco Casarini as Domestico
 Gastone Sarti as Sicario (voice)
 Giuseppe Morresi as Araldo
 Natale De Carolis as Prima apparizione (voice)
 Marco Fanti as Terza apparizione (voice)

References

External links

1987 films
1980s musical films
French musical films
1980s Italian-language films
Films directed by Claude d'Anna
Films based on operas
Films based on Macbeth
Giuseppe Verdi
Opera films
1980s French films